Pobè is a city and arrondissement located in the Plateau Department of Benin. The commune covers an area of 400 square kilometres and as of 2013 had a population of 123,740 people.

References

Communes of Benin
Arrondissements of Benin
Populated places in the Plateau Department